The UNCP School of Business is located within the University of North Carolina at Pembroke. All undergraduate and graduate degree programs are fully accredited by the Association to Advance Collegiate Schools of Business (AACSB).

Undergraduate degrees are the Bachelor of Science in Business Administration (BSBA) and the Bachelor of Science in Accounting (BSA). Some programs are offered fully online. A Master of Business Administration (MBA) degree is offered on campus as well as a completely online format.

Background 

The UNCP School of Business received AACSB re-accreditation in 2018.

The School of Business on the main campus of UNCP will be undergoing a transformation with a new dedicated facility.

Undergraduate degrees 

The UNCP School of Business offers two undergraduate degrees:

 Bachelor of Science in Accounting (BSA)
 Bachelor of Science in Business Administration (BSBA) - with concentrations available in:
 Economics
 Entrepreneurship
 Finance
 International business
 Management
 Marketing

 The school of business offers a Certificate in Entrepreneurship
 For non-business administration students the following minors are offered:
 Business administration
 Economics
 Entrepreneurship 
 Finance
 Quantitative finance 
 Management 
 Marketing

 The Passport to Success Program is a requirement for all business students to prepare for after college and be ready for their life-long learning and careers.

Graduate degrees 
A Masters of Business Administration (MBA) is offered by the UNCP School of Business as either a full-time day program or as a part-time evening program. An accelerated online MBA program is also available.
Admitted to the MBA program requires the Graduate Management Admission Test (GMAT).

Faculty
The UNCP School of Business currently has thirty full-time faculty positions and 27 adjunct faculty. The use of adjuncts allows the three departments to offer more courses and bring a practitioner perspective to the students' education. The school's faculty is organized into three departments. As of December 2018, the leadership team and full-time faculty includes:

Leadership:
 Barry O'Brien - Dean and Associate Professor
 James Frederick - Associate Dean and Associate Professor
 Christine  Bell - Director of MBA Program

Accounting and finance department:
 Victor Bahhouth
 Jane Baird
 Sharon Bell
 Steven Bukowy
 David Fricke
 Rebecca Gonzalez-Ehnes
 Joseph P. Lakatos
 Mohammad Rahman
 Craig Shoulders

Economics and decision sciences department:
 Mohammad Ashraf
 Lydia Gan
 Zhixin "Richard" Kang
 Bishwa Koirala
 Edwin "Cliff" Mensah
 Xinyan Shi

Management, marketing, and international business department:
 Gaye Acikdilli
 Nick Arena
 William "Rick" Crandall
 Melissa Mann
 Si Ahn Mehng
 Keondra Mitchell
 Susan Peters
 John E. "Jack" Spillan
 Chaunhui "Charles" Xiong
 Christopher Ziemnowicz

Endowed professorships
 Thomas Family Endowed Chair in Entrepreneurship
 William Henry Belk Endowed Chair of Management

Special activities

Special activities in the School of Business at UNCP include:
 Accounting Students Association
 Enactus
 Volunteer Income Tax Assistance Program (VITA)
 Distinguished Executive Speaker's Series
 Economics club

Thomas Family Center for Entrepreneurship

The Entrepreneurship Center is funded with a gift from Pembroke native and Los Angeles commercial real-estate developer Jim Thomas and his family's foundation. Thomas was born in Pembroke, North Carolina and grew up in Cleveland, Ohio. He maintains close ties to his home community. Located off-campus in COMtech near the UNCP Regional Center for Economic, Community, and Professional Development, the Thomas Center is designed to assist small businesses in the region. It applies the talents of UNCP's faculty to the business community and serves as a training ground for students. The center also has student interns from different majors.

Publications
UNCP School of Business is a partner in the scholarly journal, the International Journal of Sustainable Strategic Management (IJSSM) published by Inderscience.

Office of Economic and Business Research
The Office of Economic and Business Research (EBR) is intended to provide data to assist in regional economic progress. The target audience includes local area businesses and new firms that are relocating to the region. Publication include "The Economic and Social Impacts of The University" demonstrating the positive economic and social impact of UNCP for the region and state.

Notes

External links
 Official home page retrieved on December 8, 2018.

Business schools in North Carolina
School of Business